The 2021–22 Utah Utes women's basketball team represented the University of Utah during the 2021–22 NCAA Division I women's basketball season. The Utes, led by seventh year head coach Lynne Roberts, played their home games at the Jon M. Huntsman Center and competed as members of the Pac-12 Conference.

Previous season
The Utes finished the season with a record of 5–16, and a 4–11 record in Pac-12 play to finish in tenth place. They lost in the first round of the Pac-12 women's tournament where they lost to Washington State. They did not qualify for the NCAA or WNIT tournaments.

Roster 

Source:

Schedule and results 

|-
!colspan=9 style=| Exhibition

|-
!colspan=9 style=| Non-Conference Regular Season

|-
!colspan=9 style=| Pac-12 Regular Season

|-
!colspan=9 style=| Pac-12 Women's Tournament

|-
!colspan=9 style=| NCAA tournament

Source:

Rankings
 

*The preseason and week 1 polls were the same.^Coaches did not release a week 2 poll.

Notes

See also
 2021–22 Utah Utes men's basketball team

References 

Utah Utes women's basketball seasons
Utah
Utah Utes
Utah Utes
Utah